Nikolay Nikolayevich Dudov (born 1952) is a Russian politician, who was the Governor of Magadan Oblast of Russia in 2003–2013.

Biography 
Nikolay Dudov was born on 1 January 1952 in the town of Severo-Zadonsk (now part of Donskoy, Tula Oblast). Since 1969 he has been a locksmith at a condenser plant. In 1970-1972 he served in the Soviet Army, reaching the rank of senior sergeant. Dudov continued to work as a mechanic at the plant to 1978, when he moved to Chukotka. There he worked as a senior electrician on duty, and then as a shift supervisor at the Chukotka CHPP. Since 1982 — instructor, then head of the organizational department of the Communist Party local branch. In 1986 he went to work in the Magadan Oblast party committee.

Since 1996, he worked as an assistant, then chief adviser to governor Valentin Tsvetkov. Since November 2000 Dudov was deputy governor, and then first deputy governor of Magadan Oblast, and Tsvetkov's chief of staff. After the assassination of Tsvetkov in October 2002, Dudov was acting governor. On 16 February 2003, he was elected Governor of Magadan Oblast, overtaking mayor of Magadan Nikolay Karpenko, who was endorsed by United Russia party. Dudov took office on February 28. In February 2008 Dudov was appointed for a new term by Magadan Oblast Duma. In February 2013 he was succeeded by Vladimir Pechyony.

References

1952 births
Living people
Governors of Magadan Oblast
United Russia politicians
Recipients of the Order of Honour (Russia)
People from Donskoy, Tula Oblast